The Wonderful Story is a 1932 British drama film directed by Reginald Fogwell and starring Wyn Clare, John Batten and Moore Marriott. It was based on the 1921 short story of the same name written by I.A.R. Wylie, which had previously been turned into a 1922 silent film of the same title. A quota quickie, it was largely shot on location in Devon.

Premise
A paralysed farmer watches as the girl he intends to marry falls in love with his brother.

Cast
 Wyn Clare as Mary Richards 
 John Batten as John Martin 
 Eric Bransby Williams as Bob Martin 
 Moore Marriott as Zacky Richards 
 J. Fisher White as Parson 
 Sam Livesey as Doctor 
 Ernest Lester as Amos

References

Bibliography
 Chibnall, Steve. Quota Quickies: The Birth of the British 'B' Film. British Film Institute, 2007.
 Low, Rachael. Filmmaking in 1930s Britain. George Allen & Unwin, 1985.
 Wood, Linda. British Films, 1927-1939. British Film Institute, 1986.

External links
 

1932 films
1932 drama films
Films directed by Reginald Fogwell
British drama films
Films set in England
British black-and-white films
Films based on works by I. A. R. Wylie
1930s English-language films
1930s British films
Films shot in Devon
Sound film remakes of silent films
English-language drama films